On 4 April 1997, a Canadian Armed Forces helicopter was allegedly illuminated by a laser while observing the Russian merchant ship and suspected spy vessel Kapitan Man, which was in the Strait of Juan de Fuca in U.S. territorial waters near Port Angeles, Washington. The Canadian Air Force pilot and the U.S. Navy passenger, who was taking photographs of the ship, reportedly suffered eye pain and injuries consistent with laser exposure. However, subsequent investigations into the incident were unable to verify that any lasing had occurred.

Background
Responding to a request based on previous suspicious activity of the Kapitan Man, the Canadian Forces dispatched a CH-124 helicopter to fly by the ship and take photographs of it and its abnormal aerial antenna structure, which was indicative of a ship that could be conducting ELINT or SIGINT activities. The U.S. Coast Guard had previously confiscated submarine surveillance equipment from the ship in 1993.

On board the aircraft were U.S. Navy Lieutenant Jack Daly and Canadian Forces pilot Captain Patrick Barnes. Lt. Daly was the Navy's foreign-intelligence liaison officer in Esquimalt, British Columbia, heading a joint U.S.-Canadian helicopter-surveillance operation against Russian, Chinese, and other spy ships operating in the Strait of Juan de Fuca, which separates the Canadian province of British Columbia from the U.S. state of Washington, and in Puget Sound, the site of major U.S. nuclear ballistic missile submarine and aircraft carrier bases with the Royal Canadian Navy Pacific Fleet Headquarters in Esquimalt Harbour near Victoria, B.C.

Laser damage
While taking photographs of the ship and its bridge, Lt. Daly suddenly experienced intense pain in his right eye as well as temporary blindness. After examination, it was concluded that Daly suffered direct laser burns to his right eye, as well as other vision problems and severe headaches. Daly testified that Capt. Barnes was also injured in a similar manner and was permanently grounded as a result of this incident; he has since lost all his flight qualifications. A United States Army Medical Research Department analysis indicated that the crew was most likely hit with a Nd:YAG laser.

In February 1999, Daly testified before the U.S. House Armed Services Committee about his experience. He said that he and Capt. Barnes both had extreme sensitivity to sunlight and light sources. Driving at night became impossible as did watching movies or night ball games: "The only form of even momentary relief that either one of us can rely on is sitting in the dark with our eyes closed,  yet lately even that does not seem to help much." In the same time period, he discussed his case on the ABC News program 20/20, saying "I've been in constant pain since the 4th of April '97, without a moment's relief."

Kapitan Man search
Shortly after the incident, U.S. Coast Guard teams were given two hours to search the vessel but did not locate a laser. Teams were not given full access to the ship, however, and the Clinton administration had warned the Russian government in advance the ship would be searched.

Lawsuit and Purple Heart request
In October 2002, Daly sued the Russian Far East Shipping Company (FESCO), owner of the Kapitan Man, in federal court. In his opening statement, Daly's lawyer laid out their side of the case. The company's lawyer countered that there was no positive evidence of a laser on the ship. The jury deliberated for a day and ruled that the laser attack could not be linked to FESCO.  Daly's lawyer told the press that the case was hampered by U.S. government resistance and unfavorable rulings by the judge.

In September 2004, the Chief of Naval Operations denied an Inspector General's recommendation that Daly be awarded the Purple Heart (for wounds sustained by opposing forces). Part of the CNO's rejection stated:

Clinical assessment

The case was analyzed in the August 2004 Archives of Ophthalmology by medical laser researchers including Dr. Bruce Stuck, then Director of the U.S. Army Medical Research Detachment of the Walter Reed Army Institute of Research, responsible for the Army Medical Department's laser and radio frequency radiation biological effects research program. Although the analysis of "Case 5" did not explicitly state Daly's name or the military nature of the ship photography, the case description is clearly that of the Strait of Juan de Fuca laser incident.

The researchers noted the photographer's (Daly's) case history:

The Analysis section of the article stated:

See also
 Lasers and aviation safety
 Submarine incident off Kildin Island
 Submarine incident off Kola Peninsula

Notes

References

International maritime incidents
Laser safety and standards
Russia–United States relations
Conflicts in 1997
Strait of Juan de Fuca